The Cage is the fourth album by British heavy metal band Tygers of Pan Tang, released on MCA Records in 1982. It marked a move in a more commercial direction, selling over 200,000 copies and giving birth to two top 50 songs in the UK, namely the covers of Leiber & Stoller's "Love Potion No. 9" and the lesser known RPM song "Rendezvous". Another single charted at 63: the Steve Thompson song "Paris by Air". It is shortly after producing this album that the band split for the first time, due to tensions with their record company. Robb Weir and Brian Dick then formed the band Sergeant.

Track listing

Personnel
Band members
Jon Deverill - vocals
Robb Weir - guitars
Fred Purser - guitars, keyboards
Richard "Rocky" Laws - bass guitar
Brian Dick - drums

Additional musicians
John Sykes - guitar on "Love Potion No. 9" and "Danger in Paradise"

Production
Peter Collins - producer
Phil Harding - engineer, mixing

Charts

Album

Singles
Love Potion No. 9

Rendezvouz

Paris by Air

References

1982 albums
Tygers of Pan Tang albums
Albums produced by Peter Collins (record producer)
MCA Records albums